The Baby is a British horror comedy limited series created by Lucy Gaymer and Siân Robins-Grace that premiered on HBO on 24 April 2022. The series consists of eight episodes.

Premise 
When 38-year-old Natasha is unexpectedly landed with a baby, her life of doing what she wants, when she wants, dramatically implodes. Stinky, controlling, manipulative and with violent powers, the baby twists Natasha's life into a horror show. Where does it come from? What does it want? And what lengths will Natasha have to go to in order to get her life back? She doesn't want a baby. The baby wants her.

Cast and characters

Main 
 Michelle de Swarte as Natasha Willams: A 38-year-old who has never made long-term plans and is unexpectedly landed with a baby.
 Amira Ghazalla as Mrs. Eaves/Nour: The 73-year-old "Enigma" who has spent 50 years living in her car.
 Amber Grappy as Bobbi Willams: Natasha's younger sister, who wants nothing more than to be a parent.
 Albie Hills and Arthur Hills as ‘The Baby’ that turns Natasha's world upside down.

Recurring 
 Patrice Naiambana as Natasha's father, Lyle
 Sinéad Cusack as Natasha's mother, Barbara
 Shvorne Marks as Mags
 Isy Suttie as Rita
 Tanya Reynolds as Helen
 Seyan Sarvan as Nour
 Karl Davies as Jack
 Divian Ladwa as Fooze

Episodes

Production

Development 
In August 2020, it was announced HBO had given a series order to The Baby. Robins-Grace, Jane Featherstone, Carolyn Strauss, and Naomi de Pear were confirmed as executive producers with Lucy Gaymer producing. The Baby is produced by HBO, Sky Atlantic, Sister Pictures, and Gaymer's Proverbial Pictures. Nicole Kassell joined in December 2020 as a lead director and executive producer. Stacey Gregg, Faraz Shariat and Elle Jones also serve as directors.

Writing 
Sophie Goodhart, Kara Smith, Anchuli Felicia King and Susan Stanton serve as writers on the series. Bisha K. Ali serves as a consulting producer.

Casting 
In June 2021, Michelle de Swarte was cast as Natasha, while Amira Ghazalla was cast as Mrs. Eaves and Amber Grappy as Bobbi. In February 2022, Patrice Naiambana, Sinéad Cusack, Shvorne Marks, Isy Suttie, Tanya Reynolds, Seyan Sarvan, Karl Davies, and Divian Ladwa joined the series.

Filming 
Filming began on 31 May 2021 in the United Kingdom.

Music 
Lucrecia Dalt serves as the series' composer. Pete Saville and Zoe Bryant are the music supervisors, and Ed Hamilton is the music editor.

Release 
The Baby premiered on HBO on 24 April 2022 and consist of eight episodes.

Reception

Critical response

The review aggregator website Rotten Tomatoes reported an 82% approval rating with an average rating of 7/10, based on 22 critic reviews. The website's critics consensus reads, "The Babys tone can be as wobbly as a rocking crib, but its audacious nature of comedy and horror deserves to be nurtured." Metacritic, which uses a weighted average, assigned a score of 71 out of 100 based on 9 critics, indicating "generally favorable reviews".

Ratings

References

External links 
 

2022 British television series debuts
2022 British television series endings
2020s British comedy television series
2020s British horror television series
British horror comedy television series
2020s British television miniseries
HBO original programming
English-language television shows
Television series about children
Television shows filmed in the United Kingdom